The Chinese Lunar Exploration Program (CLEP), also known as the Chang'e Project after the Chinese moon goddess Chang'e, is an ongoing series of robotic Moon missions by the China National Space Administration (CNSA). The program incorporates lunar orbiters, landers, rovers and sample return spacecraft, launched using Long March rockets. Launches and flights are monitored by a telemetry, tracking, and command (TT&C) system, which uses  radio antennas in Beijing and  antennas in Kunming, Shanghai, and Ürümqi to form a  VLBI antenna. A proprietary ground application system is responsible for downlink data reception.

Ouyang Ziyuan, a geologist, chemical cosmologist, and the program's chief scientist, was among the first to advocate the exploitation not only of known lunar reserves of metals such as titanium, but also of helium-3, an ideal fuel for future nuclear fusion power plants. Ye Peijian serves as the program's chief commander and chief designer. Scientist Sun Jiadong is the program's general designer and Sun Zezhou is deputy general designer. The leading program manager is Luan Enjie.

The first spacecraft of the program, the Chang'e 1 lunar orbiter, was launched from Xichang Satellite Launch Center on 24 October 2007, having been delayed from the initial planned date of 17–19 April 2007. A second orbiter, Chang'e 2, was launched on 1 October 2010. Chang'e 3, which includes a lander and rover, was launched on 1 December 2013 and successfully soft-landed on the Moon on 14 December 2013. Chang'e 4, which includes a lander and rover, was launched on 7 December 2018 and landed on 3 January 2019 on the South Pole-Aitken Basin, on the far side of the Moon. A sample return mission, Chang'e 5, which launched on 23 November 2020 and returned on 16 December in the same year, brought 1,731 g (61.1 oz) of lunar samples back to earth.

As indicated by the official insignia, the shape of a calligraphic nascent lunar crescent with two human footprints at its center reminiscent of the Chinese character , the Chinese character for "Moon", the ultimate objective of the program is to pave the way for a crewed mission to the Moon. China National Space Administration head Zhang Kejian announced that China is planning to build a scientific research station on the Moon's south pole "within the next 10 years," (2019–2029).

Program structure
The Chinese Lunar Exploration Program is divided into four main operational phases, with each mission serving as a technology demonstrator in preparation for future missions. International cooperation in the form of various payloads and a robotic station is invited by China.

Phase I: Orbital missions
The first phase entailed the launch of two lunar orbiters, and is now effectively complete.

Chang'e 1, launched on 24 October 2007 aboard a Long March 3A rocket, scanned the entire Moon in unprecedented detail, generating a high definition 3D map that would provide a reference for future soft landings. The probe also mapped the abundance and distribution of various chemical elements on the lunar surface as part of an evaluation of potentially useful resources.
Chang'e 2, launched on 1 October 2010 aboard a Long March 3C rocket, reached the Moon in under 5 days, compared to 12 days for Chang'e 1, and mapped the Moon in even greater detail. It then left lunar orbit and headed for the Earth–Sun  Lagrangian point in order to test the TT&C network. Having done that it completed a flyby of asteroid 4179 Toutatis on 13 December 2012, before heading into deep space to further test the TT&C network.

Phase II: Soft landers/rovers

The second phase is ongoing, and incorporates spacecraft capable of soft-landing on the Moon and deploying lunar rovers.

Chang'e 3, launched on 2 December 2013 aboard a Long March 3B rocket, landed on the Moon on 14 December 2013. It carried with it a  lunar rover named Yutu, which was designed to explore an area of  during a 3-month mission. It was also supposed to conduct ultra-violet observations of galaxies, active galactic nuclei, variable stars, binaries, novae, quasars, and blazars, as well as the structure and dynamics of the Earth's plasmasphere.
Chang'e 4 was launched on 7 December 2018. Originally scheduled for 2015, was a back-up for Chang'e 3. However, as a result of the success of that mission, the configuration of Chang'e 4 was adjusted for the next mission. It landed on 3 January 2019 on the South Pole-Aitken Basin, on the far side of the Moon, and deployed the Yutu-2 rover.

Phase III: Sample-return
The third phase included a lunar sample-return mission.

Chang'e 5-T1 was launched on 23 October 2014. It was designed to test the lunar return spacecraft.
Chang'e 5 was launched on 23 November 2020, landed near Mons Rümker on the moon on 1 December 2020, and returned to earth with 2 kilograms of lunar soil on 16 December 2020.

Final Phase: Lunar robotic research station
Phase IV is the development of an autonomous lunar research station near the Moon's south pole. The Phase IV program entered active development in 2023 following the successful completion of the previous three phases.

Chang'e 6, expected to launch in 2025, will investigate the topography, composition and subsurface structure of the South Pole–Aitken basin. The mission will return samples to Earth.
Chang'e 7, expected to launch in 2026, is a mission that will explore the south pole for resources. The mission will include an orbiter, a relay satellite, a lander, a mini-flying probe, and the Rashid 2 rover provided by the United Arab Emirates.
Chang'e 8, expected to launch in 2028, will verify in-situ resource development and utilization technologies. It may include a lander, a rover, and a flying detector, as well as a 3D-printing experiment using in situ resource utilization (ISRU) to test-build a structure, It will also transport a small sealed ecosystem experiment. It will test technology necessary to the construction of a lunar science base.

Crewed mission phase

, China was reviewing preliminary studies for a crewed lunar landing mission in the 2030s, and possibly building an outpost near the lunar south pole with international cooperation.

2035: International moon base and application 
In 2021, China and Russia announced they will be building a moon base together, also formally invited more countries and international organizations to join their International Lunar Research Station (ILRS) project being developed by the two nations, as a competitor to the American Artemis Program.

List of missions

Conducted missions

Upcoming missions

Key technologies

Long-range TT&C

The biggest challenge in Phase I of the program was the operation of the TT&C system, because its transmission capability needed sufficient range to communicate with the probes in lunar orbit. In addition, the Chang'e probes had to carry out many attitude maneuvers during their flights to the Moon and during operations in lunar orbit. At present, the combination of the TT&C system and the Chinese astronomical observation network has met the needs of the Chang'e program, but only by a small margin.

Environmental adaptability
The complexity of the space environment encountered during the Chang'e missions imposed strict requirements for environmental adaptability and reliability of the probes and their instruments. The high-radiation environment in Earth-Moon space required hardened electronics to prevent electromagnetic damage to spacecraft instruments.

Orbit design and flight sequence control
Given the conditions of the three-body system of the Earth, Moon and a space probe, the orbit design of lunar orbiters is more complicated than that of Earth-orbiting satellites, which only deal with a two-body system. The Chang'e 1 and Chang'e 2 probes were first sent into highly elliptical Earth orbits. After separating from their launch vehicles, they entered an Earth-Moon transfer orbit through three accelerations in the phase-modulated orbit. These accelerations were conducted 16, 24, and 48 hours into the missions, during which several orbit adjustments and attitude maneuvers were carried out so as to ensure the probes' capture by lunar gravity. After operating in the Earth-Moon orbit for 4–5 days, each probe entered a lunar acquisition orbit. After entering their target orbits, conducting three braking maneuvers and experiencing three different orbit phases, Chang'e 1 and Chang'e 2 carried out their missions.

Attitude control
Lunar orbiters have to remain properly oriented with respect to the Earth, Moon and Sun. All onboard detectors must be kept facing the lunar surface in order to complete their scientific missions, communication antennas have to face the Earth in order to receive commands and transfer scientific data, and solar panels must be oriented toward the Sun in order to acquire power. During lunar orbit, the Earth, the Moon and the Sun also move, so attitude control is a complex three-vector control process. The Chang'e satellites need to adjust their attitude very carefully to maintain an optimal angle towards all three bodies.

Hazard avoidance
During the second phase of the program, in which the spacecraft were required to soft-land on the lunar surface, it was necessary to devise a system of automatic hazard avoidance in order that the landers would not attempt to touch down on unsuitable terrain. Chang'e 3 utilized a computer vision system in which the data from a down-facing camera, as well as 2 ranging devices, were processed using specialized software. The software controlled the final stages of descent, adjusting the attitude of the spacecraft and the throttle of its main engine. The Yutu rover is also equipped with front-facing stereo cameras and hazard avoidance technology.

Cooperation with Russia

In November 2017, China and Russia signed an agreement on cooperative lunar and deep space exploration. The agreement includes six sectors, covering lunar and deep space, joint spacecraft development, space electronics, Earth remote sensing data, and space debris monitoring. Russia may also look to develop closer ties with China in human spaceflight, and even shift its human spaceflight cooperation from the US to China and build a crewed lunar lander.

Gallery

See also

 Chinese space program
 Planetary Exploration of China
 Tianwen-1 - 2020 Mars mission
 Exploration of the Moon
 List of missions to the Moon

References

External links

CLEP official website
 Data Release and Information Service System of China's Lunar Exploration Program
 
Encyclopedia Astronautica
The Scientific Objectives of Chinese Lunar Exploration Project by Ouyang Ziyuan
我国发射首颗探月卫星专题
嫦娥探月专题 
 

 
21st century in China
China National Space Administration
Exploration of the Moon